Joseph Vũ Văn Thiên (born 26 October 1960) is a Vietnamese prelate of the Catholic Church. A bishop since 2002, he was appointed Metropolitan Archbishop of Hanoi on 17 November 2018.

Biography
Thiên was born in Ke Sat in Hải Dương Province on 26 October 1960. He has four siblings. He entered the Major Seminary of Saint Joseph in Hanoi in 1982 and completed his work in philosophy and theology there. He was ordained a priest of the Diocese of Hải Phòng on 24 January 1988.

He was bishop's secretary from 1988 to 1994 and held parish assignments from 1988 to 1996. From 1996 to 2000 he studied at the Institut Catholique de Paris, earning his licentiate in theology.

He was Professor of Theology at the Major Seminary in Hanoi from 2000 to 2002.

Pope John Paul II named him Bishop of Hai Phòng on 26 November 2002 and he received his episcopal consecration on 2 January 2003 from Cardinal Paul Joseph Phạm Đình Tụng, Archbishop of Hanoi. In November 2017, Thien presided at a ceremony initiating construction of a church to replace a historic shrine dedicated to local martyrs that was destroyed in a U.S. air raid in 1967.

On 17 November 2018, Pope Francis named him to succeed Cardinal Pierre Nguyên Văn Nhon as Archbishop of Hà Nội.

Within the Catholic Bishops' Conference of Vietnam he heads the Committee on Youth.

See also
Catholic Church in Vietnam

References

External links

1960 births
Living people
People from Hải Dương province
Institut Catholique de Paris alumni
21st-century Roman Catholic archbishops in Vietnam
Vietnamese Roman Catholic archbishops